Gorky 5 is the fifth album by Welsh band Gorky's Zygotic Mynci, released on 27 August 1998. It was their last album for Mercury Records and features the singles "Let's Get Together (In Our Minds)" and "Sweet Johnny".

Track listing
All songs written by E. Childs, unless otherwise stated.

"The Tidal Wave" – 3:04
"Dyle Fi" – 3:00
"Let's Get Together (In Our Minds)" – 3:15
"Tsunami" – 3:42 (Lawrence)
"Not Yet" – 3:41 (Lawrence)
"Only the Sea Makes Sense" – 2:45
"Softly" – 5:59 (Lawrence)
"Frozen Smile" – 1:24
"Sweet Johnny" – 4:42
"Theme from Gorky 5 (Russian Song)" – 4:06
"Hush the Warmth" – 3:28
"Catrin" – 3:06

Personnel

Euros Childs - vocals, piano, organ, electric piano, synths, timpani (1), bass (5), guitar (6)
John Lawrence - guitar, vocals, piano (4,5,7), mandolin (3,4), organ (2,4,5), bass (12), pedal steel (4,6), electric piano (6)
Richard James - bass, guitar (5,6,11,12), organ (9)
Megan Childs - violin, vocals, viola (2)
Euros Rowlands - drums, percussion, sub-bass (7)
Gorwel Owen - vox bass (1), synth (11), harmonium (12)
Lindsay Higgs - balalaika (10)
Sonia Slany - violin and string arrangements (3,4)
Anna Hemery - violin (3,4)
Jackie Norry - violin (3,4)
Julie Singleton - violin (3,4)
Jocelyn Pook - viola (3,4)
Jackie Woods - viola (3,4)
Dinah Beamish - cello (3,4)
Sophie Harris - cello (3,4)

References

External links

Gorky 5 at YouTube (streamed copy where licensed)

1998 albums
Gorky's Zygotic Mynci albums
Mercury Records albums
Albums produced by Gorwel Owen